Zhukovsky or Zhukovski is an East Slavic masculine surname. Its feminine counterpart is Zhukovskaya (Russian) or Zhukovska (Ukrainian). It originates from the noun zhuk, which means beetle and is used as slang for a person with dark hair. Notable people with the surname include:

 Alexandra Zhukovskaya (1842–1899), Russian noble and lady in waiting
 Aleksey Belevsky-Zhukovsky (1871–1931), Russian nobleman 
 Denis Zhukovskiy (born 1980), Russian football player
 Nikolay Zhukovsky (revolutionary) (1833–1895), Russian revolutionary
 Nikolay Zhukovsky (scientist) (1847–1921), Russian scientist
 Stanislav Zhukovsky (1875–1944), Polish-Russian impressionist painter
 Valentin Zhukovski (1858–1918), Russian orientalist
 Valery Zhukowski (born 1984), Belarusian footballer
 Vasily Zhukovsky (1783–1852), Russian poet
 Vitaly Zhukovsky (born 1984), Belarusian footballer

See also
 
 Žukauskas, Lithuanian surname
 Żukowski, Polish surname

References

Russian-language surnames
Ukrainian-language surnames
Belarusian-language surnames